Excelsior, Wisconsin may refer to:
Excelsior, Richland County, Wisconsin, an unincorporated community in Richland County
Excelsior, Sauk County, Wisconsin, a town in Sauk County